General elections were held in Turks and Caicos Islands on 15 December 2016. The result was a victory for the People's Democratic Movement (PDM), with Sharlene Cartwright-Robinson becoming the islands' first female Premier. Following the election outgoing Prime Minister Rufus Ewing resigned as Progressive National Party (PNP) leader and quit politics.

Electoral system
At the time of the election, the House of Assembly had 15 elected members and four appointed members. The 15 elected members were elected by two methods; ten were elected from single-member constituencies, with five elected on an at-large basis, with voters able to vote for up to five candidates at the national level. The four appointed members include one nominated by the Premier, one nominated by the Leader of the Opposition and two members appointed by the Governor.

Campaign
A total of 31 candidates contested the 10 single-member constituencies; the PDM and PNP both ran full slates of 10 candidates, whilst the Progressive Democratic Alliance (PDA) had eight. The remaining three candidates were independents. There were also 21 candidates in the at-large constituency, five each from the PDM and PNP, four from the PDA and seven independents.

Results

By constituency

References

2016 elections in British Overseas Territories
2016 in the Turks and Caicos Islands
Elections in the Turks and Caicos Islands
2016 elections in the Caribbean
December 2016 events in North America